Ardabil Airport  is an airport north-east of Ardabil, in north-western Iran.

History
On 2 July 2015, the Iranian Minister of Roads held a press conference after his recent visit at the Paris Air Show. He announced the installation of an ILS system at Ardabil Airport which will "decrease the flight cancellations with up to 50 percent".

Airlines and destinations

References

External links

Airports in Iran
Buildings and structures in Ardabil Province
Transportation in Ardabil Province